Sönke Neitzel (born 26 June 1968) is a German historian who has written extensively about the Second World War. He is editor of the journal German History in the 20th Century and has written several books such as Soldaten: On Fighting, Killing and Dying; The Secret Second World War Tapes of German POWs based on recordings of German POWs held at Trent Park which he wrote with Harald Welzer. Neitzel edited the book Tapping Hitler's Generals (with Harald Welzer).

Neitzel was educated at the University of Mainz and is currently Professor of Military History at the University of Potsdam, having moved there from the London School of Economics in 2015. He has also held posts at the University of Karlsruhe, University of Bern, and the University of Saarbrücken in Germany and Switzerland, and was briefly Professor of Global Security at the University of Glasgow in 2011/12.

References

External links
Professional page at Potsdam
"Military History 3.0", since 2016, Neitzel has been teaching military history and the cultural history of violence at the University of Potsdam. (In German)

1968 births
Writers from Hamburg
20th-century German historians
Living people
German male non-fiction writers
Academics of the London School of Economics
21st-century German historians